Bada Bagh, also called Barabagh  (lit. "grand garden" in Hindustani) is a garden complex located about six kilometers north of Jaisalmer in the Indian state of Rajasthan. Overlooking a mango grove sits a set of royal chhatri cenotaphs constructed by the Maharajas of the Jaisalmer State in the 18th, 19th and early 20th centuries CE.

History

A descendant of Maharawal Jaisal Singh, the founder of Jaisalmer State, Jait Singh II (1497–1530), commissioned a dam to create a water tank during his reign in the 16th century CE. This made the desert green in this area.

After Jait Singh II's death, his son Lunkaran (1530-1551) built a beautiful garden by the lake and a memorial chhatri cenotaph on a hill overlooking the lake. Later on, many more cenotaphs were constructed here for Lunkaran and other Bhattis. The last chhatri, meant for Maharawal Jawahir Singh, dates from the 20th century and remains unfinished after Indian independence.

Description 
Bada Bagh is situated on a small hill. The memorial chhatri cenotaphs have all been carved out of sandstone blocks, but have been built in at least four different sizes - for the ruling kings, their queens, their princes, and other royal family members. Each cenotaph has a marble slab with inscriptions about the deceased royal and a symbolic image of a man on a horse.

References

External links
Bada Bagh Garden Complex with Rajput Royal Cenotaphs

Gardens in Rajasthan
Tourist attractions in Jaisalmer district
History of Rajasthan
1740s establishments in India
Cenotaphs in India
Monuments and memorials in Rajasthan
18th-century establishments in India
Tourism in Jaisalmer
Rajput architecture
Buildings and structures in Jaisalmer